Amblyseius yadongensis is a species of mite in the family Phytoseiidae.

References

yadongensis
Articles created by Qbugbot
Animals described in 1987